Ciudad Serdán (formerly St. Andres Chalchicomula) is the municipal seat of Chalchicomula de Sesma Municipality in the Mexican state of Puebla.

Its geographical coordinates are 18° 59′ North, and  97° 27′  West. Its average altitude is 2,520 m above sea level

References

External links
 https://web.archive.org/web/20110526203349/http://www.e-local.gob.mx/work/templates/enciclo/puebla/Mpios/21045a.htm

Populated places in Puebla
Populated places established in 1560